Mohamed Arif, also known as Bakaa (born 11 August 1985) is a Maldivian footballer who plays as a midfielder for Myanmar National league club Kanbawza Football Club and the Maldivian National Team. Arif won the best football player of the year for 2010, and won second best player for the year 2011. He also won third best player for the year 2013.

Club career

IFC / VB Sports Club 
The first club he played with was Island Football Club (IFC), starting from 2004, which was later re-branded to VB Sports Club in the back on 8 November 2006.

Club Valencia
After leaving VB Sports Club in 2007 he joined Club Valencia for the 2008 season in the Dhivehi League.
He left the club by season end.

New Radiant SC
Arif joined New Radiant SC for the 2009 season of the Dhivehi League. He stayed at the club for two seasons.
2009 and 2010 respectively.

Return to VB Sports Club
Arif returned to VB Sports Club for the 2011 season of the Dhiraagu Dhivehi League and helped the club win the title of Champions of the 2011 season of the Dhiraagu Dhivehi League.

Eagles Sports Club
Arif joined Eagles Sports Club for the 2012 season of the Dhiraagu Dhivehi League. He left the club the season end.

Maziya Sports Club
Arif joined Maziya Sports Club for the 2013 season of the Dhivehi League. At the end of the season, he extended his contract for another year.

Kanbawza Football Club
On 2 January 2014, Arif joined Myanmar's first division and Premier League Club Kanbawza Football Club (KBZ FC).

International career

Senior team 
Due to his notable skills as a midfielder and his abilities as playmaker it did not take long for him to be noticed and he was soon included in the starting eleven of the National senior team of the Maldives.

2008 SAFF Championship
Bakaa starred in the 2005 SAFF Championship which was hosted by Pakistan. He starred in the 2008 SAFF Championship which was hosted by both Maldives and Sri Lanka, and helped Maldives win their first title in the championship. He also starred in the 2009, 2011, 2013, 2015 and 2018 in which Maldives won their 2nd title in the championship SAFF Championship.

Honours

Maldives
 SAFF Championship: 2008, 2018

References

External links 
 
 

1985 births
Living people
People from Malé
Maldivian footballers
Maldives international footballers
Maldivian expatriate footballers
Club Valencia players
New Radiant S.C. players
Victory Sports Club players
Association football forwards
Expatriate footballers in Myanmar
Maldivian expatriate sportspeople in Myanmar
Kanbawza F.C. players
Footballers at the 2006 Asian Games
Footballers at the 2014 Asian Games
Asian Games competitors for the Maldives
Club Eagles players